Peter Joseph Aloysius Coyne (6 July 1917 – 4 November 2001) was an Australian politician who was a Liberal Party member of the Legislative Assembly of Western Australia from 1971 to 1986, representing the seat of Murchison-Eyre.

Coyne was born in Geraldton, a port city in Western Australia's Mid West region, but his family moved to Yalgoo soon after his birth. After leaving school, he worked as a miner and metallurgist, and then at Agnew as a storekeeper. Coyne enlisted in the Royal Australian Air Force (RAAF) in 1941, and during the war served as a radio technician, eventually reaching the rank of flight sergeant. After the war's end, he returned to Agnew for a period, and then went to live in Perth, where he also worked as a storekeeper, television salesman, and life insurance salesman. Coyne entered parliament at the 1971 state election, succeeding the retiring Richard Burt as the member for Murchison-Eyre. He retired at the 1986 election, having served as deputy chairman of committees from 1980 to 1981, and died in Perth in 2001, aged 84.

References

1917 births
2001 deaths
Liberal Party of Australia members of the Parliament of Western Australia
Members of the Western Australian Legislative Assembly
People from Geraldton
Royal Australian Air Force personnel of World War II
20th-century Australian politicians
Royal Australian Air Force airmen